Divas Hit the Road (花儿与少年) is a reality television show which is produced by Hunan Broadcasting System in the second quarter of 2014. The show is directed by Liao Ke, who is also the director of The X Factor: Zhongguo Zui Qiang Yin. The show was first broadcast on April 25, 2015.

Season 2 was broadcast on April 25, 2015 and star an entirely new cast. The last episode was on July 4, 2015.

Season 1

Sisters 
Cheng Pei-pei
Zhang Kaili
Xu Qing
Liu Tao
Li Fei'er

Brothers
Hans Zhang
Hua Chenyu

Locations
Italy
Spain

Role

Season 2

Sisters 
Mao Amin 
Xu Qing (Third Guide)
Ning Jing
Ivy Chen 
Zheng Shuang (First Guide)

Brothers 
Jing Boran (Second Guide)
Yang Yang

Locations 
England 
Turkey 
United Arab Emirates

Role

Season 3

Sisters
Jiang Shuying
Guli Nazha
Lai Yumeng
Song Zuer

Brothers
Tony Yang
Chen Bolin (Individual and Third Guide)
Zhang Ruoyun (Second Guide)
Jing Boran (First Guide)

Locations
Brazil
South Africa
Namibia
Australia

Role

Timeline

List of episodes

Series overview

2014 Chinese television series debuts
2015 Chinese television series debuts
2017 Chinese television series debuts
Chinese variety television shows